The Mariston Hotel is a skyscraper and hotel in the Central Business District of Johannesburg, South Africa. It was built in 1973 and is 32 storeys tall.

References 
Amethyst: Johannesburg Landmarks. Retrieved 11 February 2008.

Hotel buildings completed in 1973
Skyscrapers in Johannesburg
Hotels established in 1973
Skyscraper hotels